Although the majority of the Nigerian Muslim population is Sunni, there is a small Shia minority, particularly in the northern states of Kano and Sokoto. However, there are no actual statistics that reflect a Shia population in Nigeria, and a figure of even 5% of the total Nigerian Muslim population is thought to be too high “because of the routine conflation of Shi’a with Sunnis who express solidarity with the Iranian revolutionary program, such as those of Zakzaky’s Ikhwani.”

Introduction of Shia in Nigeria
Shia faith was "almost unknown" in Nigeria until the 1980s, when Ibraheem Zakzaky introduced Shia Islam. Zakzaky's gained a following among those disenchanted with the political and religious establishment.

Persecution
Members of the Nigerian Shia community have been persecuted in some cases, but in other cases have united with Nigerian Sunni in the Islamic Movement in Nigeria. Cleric Sheikh Ibraheem Zakzaky is a primary figure in the movement.

Saudi Arabia’s linked Sunni politicians, organizations and Nigerian security apparatus are behind the persecution of Shia Muslims in Nigeria. The Salafist movement Izala Society, is close to both Riyadh and Abuja and its satellite television channel Manara often broadcasts anti-Shiite sectarian propaganda.

The state government of Sokoto has reacted to the rise of Shia Islam in the state by taking such measures as demolishing the Islamic Center in 2007. Furthermore, clashes between Sunni and Shia residents followed the assassination of Salafi Imam Umaru Danmaishiyya, who was known for his fiery anti-Shia preaching.

In 2014, the Zaria Quds Day massacres took place, leaving 35 dead. In 2015, the Zaria massacre during which 348 Shia Muslims were killed by the Nigerian Army.

In April 2018, clashes broke out as Nigerian police fired teargas Shia protesters who were demanding the release of Sheikh Ibrahim Zakzaky, who had been detained for two years with no trial. The clashes left at least one protester dead and several others injured. Further, Nigerian police detained at least 115 protesters.

In October 2018, Nigerian military killed at least 45 peaceful Shia protesters. After soldiers began to fire, they targeted protesters fleeing the chaos. Many of the injured were shot in the back or legs.
In July 2021, Shaikh Zakzaky has been acquitted of all charges and has been freed.

See also

Islamic Movement (Nigeria)
Zaria Quds Day massacres
Shia in Bahrain

References

Further reading
Muhammad Mansur Nigeria’s Zaria city crammed with mourners of Imam Hussain Jafariya News, January 29, 2007.
Mohamed Ali Mosques vandalised in (Abuja) Nigeria clashes Jafariya News, June 10, 2004.
Elise Aymer Nigeria: Clash of Religions The Yale International Forum, Winter 1996.
    Biography of Zakzaky

External links
Islamic Movement in Nigeria –Nigeria's foremost Shi'a organization.